This is a complete listing of the shortest players in National Basketball Association  history at a listed height of  or shorter. Only 25 players in NBA history have been at or below this height. All of the players listed here have played or play the position of point guard. When  Isaiah Thomas tipped off against  Tyler Ulis, it was speculated to be the shortest combined jump ball ever.

The shortest player ever in the old American Basketball Association (1967–76) was Penny Ann Early, a  jockey who took part in one play in one game for the Kentucky Colonels as a publicity stunt in 1969. (The shortest signed ABA players were Jerry Dover and Monte Towe, both .)

Table

See also
List of shortest people
List of tallest players in National Basketball Association history
NBA records

Notes

References

NBA players,shortest
Shortest players
Shortest players in NBA